Christopher Lawton Newton Thompson  (14 February 1919 – 29 January 2002) was an English-born South African soldier, sportsman, educationalist and anti-apartheid politician.  He was the brother of Ossie Newton-Thompson.

References 

 Daily Telegraph obituary

South African cricketers
Cambridge University cricketers
1919 births
2002 deaths
Recipients of the Military Cross
English emigrants to South Africa
South African sportsperson-politicians